The Spike S-512 is a projected supersonic business jet, designed by Spike Aerospace, an American aerospace manufacturer firm based in Boston, Massachusetts.

Design
It would allow long flights for business and private travelers, such as from New York City to London, to take only three to four hours instead of six to seven.
The aircraft will not have windows for the passengers. Instead, it will be equipped with cameras sending external views to thin, curved displays lining the interior walls of the fuselage.

Development
In early 2014, the company planned to promote the project with an exhibit at the 2014 EAA AirVenture Oshkosh airshow.
Spike then expected to launch the plane by December 2018.
In January 2017, a subsonic scale prototype was planned to fly in summer 2017 to demonstrate low-speed aerodynamic flight characteristics, before a series of larger prototypes and a supersonic demonstrator by the end of 2018, Spike intended to certify the S-512 by 2023.
By Spring 2018, Spike studied a 40- to 50-seat variant for the 13 million passengers interested in supersonic transport projected by 2025.
In September 2018, Spike intended to fly the S-512 by early 2021 and start deliveries in 2023. In June 2021, Spike was reported to still be developing an 18-seat version.

Specifications

See also

References

External links

Proposed aircraft of the United States
Twinjets
Low-wing aircraft
Supersonic business jets